Frederick S. Treacey (1847 – After 1876), was an American professional baseball player who played outfield in the National Association and National League from 1871 to 1876.  Treacey played for the Chicago White Stockings, Athletic of Philadelphia, Philadelphia White Stockings, Philadelphia Centennials, and the New York Mutuals. His brother, Pete Treacey, was his teammate on the Mutuals in 1876.

External links
 , or Retrosheet

Brooklyn Excelsiors players
Brooklyn Eckfords (NABBP) players
Chicago White Stockings (NABBP) players
Chicago White Stockings players
Philadelphia Athletics (NA) players
Philadelphia Centennials players
Philadelphia White Stockings players
New York Mutuals players
19th-century baseball players
1847 births
Alaskas players
1876 deaths